The 1895 USFSA Football Championship was the 2nd staging of the USFSA Football Championship.

Participants

Bracket

Tournament

Quarterfinals
Club Français 5–0 FC Levallois
The White Rovers 8–1 Paris Star
Stade de Neuilly 2–1 CP Asnières  
Standard AC 13–0 United Sports Club

The match between Stade de Neuilly and CP d'Asnières saw one of the earliest demonstrations of sudden death, since the game was stopped in extra-time by referee N. Tunmer (a member of Standard AC) right after Neuilly's goal due to darkness. The Asnières club complained to the USFSA commission, but the result remained unchanged.

Semifinals 
Standard AC 18–0 Stade de Neuilly
The White Rovers 2–1 Club Français

Final 
Standard AC 3–1 The White Rovers

References

External links
RSSSF

USFSA Football Championship
1
France